LS-115509 is an opioid analgesic related to the 4-phenylpiperidine family. It is comparable to drugs such as prodine and pheneridine, but is distinguished by the presence of an ether group and furan ring at the piperidine 4-position, which are not found in other drugs of this class. In animal studies, it has around 2-3x the potency of morphine depending on what assay is used. Like prodine, it has two stereocenters and four possible enantiomers, but the activity of these has not been tested separately.

See also 
 PEPAP

References 

Synthetic opioids
Piperidines
Ethers
Mu-opioid receptor agonists